Nevarėnai (Samogitian: Nevarienā) is a town in Telšiai County, Lithuania. According to the 2011 census, the town has a population of 552 people.

History
During the Second World War, 150 Jews from the town were massacred in mass executions perpetrated by an einsatzgruppen.

References

Towns in Lithuania
Towns in Telšiai County
Telšiai District Municipality
Telshevsky Uyezd
Holocaust locations in Lithuania